The Farley–Buneman instability, or FB instability, is a microscopic plasma instability named after Donald T. Farley and Oscar Buneman. It is similar to the ionospheric Rayleigh-Taylor instability.

It occurs in collisional plasma with neutral component, and is driven by drift currents. It can be thought of as a modified two-stream instability arising from the difference in drifts of electrons and ions exceeding the ion acoustic speed.

It is present in the equatorial and polar ionospheric E-regions. In particular, it occurs in the equatorial electrojet due to the drift of electrons relative to ions, and also in the trails behind ablating meteoroids.

Since the FB fluctuations can scatter electromagnetic waves, the instability can be used to diagnose the state of ionosphere by the use of electromagnetic pulses.

Conditions
To derive the dispersion relation below, we make the following assumptions. First, quasi-neutrality is assumed. This is appropriate if we restrict ourselves to wavelengths longer than the Debye length. Second, the collision frequency between ions and background neutral particles is assumed to be much greater than the ion cyclotron frequency, allowing the ions to be treated as unmagnetized. Third, the collision frequency between electrons and background neutrals is assumed to be much less than the electron cyclotron frequency. Finally, we only analyze low frequency waves so that we can neglect electron inertia. Because the Buneman instability is electrostatic in nature, only electrostatic perturbations are considered.

Dispersion relation
We use linearized fluid equations (equation of motion, equation of continuity) for electrons and ions with Lorentz force  and collisional terms. The equation of motion for each species is: 

Electrons:        

Ions:      

where

  is the mass of species 
  is the velocity of species 
  is the temperature of species 
  is the frequency of collisions between species s and neutral particles
  is the charge of an electron
  is the electron number density
  is the Boltzmann Constant

Note that electron inertia has been neglected, and that both species are assumed to have the same number density at every point in space.The collisional term describes the momentum loss frequency of each fluid due to collisions of charged particles with neutral particles in the plasma. We also assume that all perturbed properties, such as species velocity, density, and the electric field, behave as plane waves. In other words, all physical quantities  will behave as an exponential function of time  and position  (where  is the wave number) :

. 
This can lead to oscillations if the frequency  is a real number, or to either exponential growth or exponential decay if  is complex. If we assume that the ambient electric and magnetic fields are perpendicular to one another and only analyze waves propagating perpendicular to both of these fields, the dispersion relation takes the form of:
, 
The coefficient  described the combined effect of electron and ion collisions as well as their cyclotron frequencies  and :
.

Growth rate
Solving the dispersion we arrive at frequency given as:
,
where  describes the growth rate of the instability. For FB we have the following:

.

See also
Plasma stability
Plasma Instabilities
List of plasma (physics) articles

References

Plasma instabilities